Nayab Singh Saini (born 25 January 1970) is a member of the Lok Sabha from the Bharatiya Janata Party (BJP) who represents the Kurukshetra constituency in Haryana, India.

Early life and education 
Nayab Singh Saini was born in a small village of Mizapur Majra in Ambala on 25 January 1970 in a Saini family. He attended B. R. Ambedkar Bihar University in Muzaffarpur and Ch. Charan Singh University in Meerut for gaining BA and LLB degrees.

Early career 
He joined the Rashtriya Swayamsevak Sangh, through which he met and became impressed by Manohar Lal Khattar. After some time he joined the BJP and thereafter held several local party offices, including as its president in the Ambala Cantonment. He has been a vote bank of OBCs and for a long time being a loyal to the party.

Political career 
He contested the election in Naraingarh constituency in 2010 but was defeated by Ramkishan Gurjar, registering 3,028 votes of the 116,039 total votes polled. In 2014, he won the election by 24,361 votes. He was a state minister of Haryana Government. Now he is elected as Member of Parliament from Kurukshetra.

References 

1970 births
Living people
Bharatiya Janata Party politicians from Haryana
People from Ambala
Members of the Haryana Legislative Assembly
Babasaheb Bhimrao Ambedkar Bihar University alumni